Mazin Shooni (Arabic: مازن شوني) is an Iraqi-born American three-cushion billiards player. He was born on August 25, 1961 in Baghdad, Iraq. Currently, he lives in Nashua, New Hampshire.

Palmares 
He holds the record for USBA National Three-Cushion Championship tournament high run and best game. He was inducted into the New England Billiard Hall of Fame in 2011. He won the USBA National Three-Cushion Championship in 2006. He was also a tournament director in the 2003 event.

His high run is 22 and has achieved a game average of 6.25 (25 points in 4 innings).

Mazin also owns and operates a pool room in Malden, Massachusetts called "Amazin Billiards". There are several pool tables and three-cushion billiards tables, with an additional private room in the back containing a single 12 foot snooker table.

External links

References

1961 births
Living people
American carom billiards players
American people of Iraqi descent
People from Baghdad